Stage 6 Films, Inc. is an American film production label of Sony Pictures Worldwide Acquisitions that acquires and produces feature films that are low budget and that are being released straight-to-DVD, on demand, or through streaming services. Some of their films are also being released theatrically. Once a film is finished, Sony Pictures Worldwide Acquisitions will decide if the film will be released theatrically or on a different platform.

Founded in 2007, the label takes its name from the location of its main office, the Stage 6 building at Sony Pictures Studios in Culver City, CA (originally an actual sound stage used for such films as The Wizard of Oz).

Filmography

2000s

2010s

2020s

Upcoming

International distribution 
Stage 6 occasionally also acquires international rights to films, be it worldwide excluding the United States and/or Canada, or in major territories such as the United Kingdom and Australia. Given below is a list of films (also seen on Stage 6 Films' official website) distributed internationally by Stage 6. Films which involve Stage 6 in their domestic releases as well are excluded from the list. An asterisk (*) denotes a film co-distributed with sister studio Sony Pictures Releasing International.

 2 Guns* (2013) (U.S. distribution by Universal Pictures; co-distributed with TriStar Pictures in select international territories)
 20th Century Women* (2016) (U.S. distribution by A24)
 American Woman* (2018) (U.S. distribution by Roadside Attractions and Vertical Entertainment; U.K. distribution by Signature Entertainment)
 Ammonite* (2020) (North American distribution by Neon; U.K. distribution by Lionsgate; Australian distribution by Transmission Films)
 Arrival* (2016) (North American distribution by Paramount Pictures)
 Beau Is Afraid (2023) (U.S. distribution by A24)
 The Best of Enemies* (2019) (U.S. and U.K. distribution by STX Entertainment)
 Bleed for This* (2016) (U.S. distribution by Open Road Films)
 Bodies Bodies Bodies (2022) (U.S. distribution by A24)
 Bull* (2019) (U.S. distribution by Samuel Goldwyn Films)
 Chef* (2014) (U.S. distribution by Open Road Films)
 Crooked House (2017) (U.S. distribution by Vertical Entertainment)
 Death of a Telemarketer (2020) (U.S. distribution by Vertical Entertainment)
 Demolition* (2015) (U.S. and U.K. distribution by Fox Searchlight Pictures)
 Digging for Fire* (2015) (U.S. distribution by The Orchard)
 Disobedience* (2018) (U.S. distribution by A24; U.K. distribution by Curzon Artificial Eye)
 Dope* (2015) (U.S. distribution by Open Road Films)
 Dream Horse* (2021) (U.S. distribution by Bleecker Street, U.K. distribution by Warner Bros. Pictures)
 The Edge of Seventeen* (2016) (U.S. distribution by STX Entertainment)
 Eighth Grade* (2018) (U.S. distribution by A24)
 The Forest* (2016) (North American distribution by Focus Features through Gramercy Pictures)
 Free Fire* (2016) (North American distribution by A24; U.K. distribution by StudioCanal)
 Gloria Bell* (2019) (US distribution by A24)
 The Glorias* (2020) (U.S. distribution by Roadside Attractions and LD Entertainment)
 Hearts Beat Loud (2018) (U.S. distribution by Gunpowder & Sky)
 Her* (2013) (U.S./Germany/Austria distribution by Warner Bros. Pictures)
 Honey Boy* (2019) (U.S. distribution by Amazon Studios)
 Hunt for the Wilderpeople* (2016) (U.S. distribution by the Orchard; Australian and New Zealand distribution by Madman Entertainment)
 If Beale Street Could Talk* (2018) (U.S. distribution by Annapurna Pictures through Mirror Releasing)
 Joe Bell (2020) (U.S. distribution by Roadside Attractions)
 Juliet, Naked (2018) (U.S. distribution by Roadside Attractions and Lionsgate; U.K. distribution by Universal Pictures and Focus Features)
 The Kid Detective (2020) (Canadian distribution by Level Film)
 Late Night* (2019) (U.S. distribution by Amazon Studios)
 Leave No Trace* (2018) (U.S. distribution by Bleecker Street)
 Life Itself* (2018) (U.S. distribution by Amazon Studios)
 The Lodge* (2019) (U.S. distribution by Neon)
 Love & Mercy* (2014) (U.S. distribution by Roadside Attractions and Lionsgate)
 Manchester by the Sea* (2016) (U.S. distribution by Amazon Studios and Roadside Attractions)
 Marshall* (2017) (U.S. distribution by Open Road Films)
 Montana Story (2021) (U.S. distribution by Bleecker Street)
 Mr. Holmes* (2015) (U.S. distribution by Roadside Attractions and Miramax; U.K. distribution by Entertainment One)
 Saint Maud* (2020) (U.S. distribution by A24 in association with Epix; U.K. distribution by StudioCanal)
 The Skeleton Twins* (2014) (U.S. distribution by Roadside Attractions)
 Sound of Metal* (2019) (U.S. distribution by Amazon Studios)
 Sleepless* (2017) (U.S. distribution by Open Road Films)
 Spotlight* (2015) (U.S. distribution by Open Road Films)
 Studio 666 (2022) (U.S. distribution by Open Road Films)
 Them That Follow* (2019) (U.S. distribution by 1091 Pictures)
 The Tomorrow Man* (2019) (U.S. distribution by Bleecker Street)
 Whiplash (2014) (U.S distribution by Sony Pictures Classics)
 Wildlife* (2018) (U.S. distribution by IFC Films)
 Zola* (2020) (U.S. distribution by A24)

See also 
 Columbia Pictures
 Screen Gems
 TriStar Pictures
 Triumph Films
 Destination Films
 Polydor Communications

References

External links 
 Official Stage 6 Films website

American companies established in 2007
Sony Pictures Entertainment Motion Picture Group
Film production companies of the United States
Sony Pictures Entertainment